Ernest Flammarion (May 30, 1846, Montigny-le-Roi - January 21, 1936, Paris) was a French publisher, founder of Groupe Flammarion (Flammarion-Marpon Editions).

Biography 
Ernest Flammarion is the fourth in a family of six children whose eldest son, Camille, was a famous astronomer. His parents Jules and Françoise Flammarion ran a haberdashery business.

In 1867, he began working in the bookstore business of Mr. Didier in Paris thanks to the recommendation of his brother Camille.

Flammarion Foundation 
He owes his fame to the publishing house that he founded in association with the Charles Marpon bookstore in 1876, the Flammarion-Marpon editions (now Groupe Flammarion), located in the former Café Voltaire on the Place de l'Odeon in the current 6th arrondissement of Paris. The success of this business is due to the commercial success of Popular Astronomy, his brother's book that he published in 1878. It was a huge bestseller in the late 19th century.

Subsequently, Flammarion Editions turned towards literature by publishing a wide variety of classical, modern authors (Stendhal, Balzac, Gustave Flaubert, Zola, Maupassant, Jules Renard) or more popular authors like Hector Malot, then the catalog was diversified and now covers virtually all publishing sectors with a predilection for popular science and humanities publications.

Posterity of editions 
The house remained family-run, run by Ernest's son, Charles, then his grandson, Henri Flammarion, who took over in 1967. The last of the family's descendants, Charles-Henri Flammarion  ran the company from 1985 to 2000, when it came under the control of the Italian group RCS. The latter then went through a period when he encountered financial difficulties. To bail out, in June 2016, he sold the Flammarion editions to the Gallimard group.

See also 
Groupe Flammarion

Café Voltaire

References

External links 
Virtual International Authority File (Virtual International Authority File)
 ISNI - International Standard Name Identifier (ISNI - International Standard Name Identifier)

1846 births
1936 deaths
French publishers (people)
French publishing families